The 2017 Laurence Olivier Awards were held on 9 April 2017 at the Royal Albert Hall, London. The ceremony was hosted by comedian Jason Manford. A highlights show was shown on ITV shortly after the live event ended.

Eligibility 
Any new production that opened between 17 February 2016 and 21 February 2017 in a theatre represented in membership of the Society of London Theatre was eligible for consideration, provided it had performed at least 30 performances.

Event calendar
2 March: Kenneth Branagh announced as the recipient of the Society Special Award
6 March: Nominations announced by Denise Gough and Matt Henry on Facebook Live
10 March: Nominations party held; Jason Manford announced as the host of the ceremony
9 April: Award ceremony held

Winners and nominees
The nominations were announced on 6 March 2017 in 26 categories.

{| class=wikitable width="100%"
|-
!width="50%" |Best New Play
!width="50%" |Best New Musical
|-
|valign="top" |
Harry Potter and the Cursed Child script and story by Jack Thorne, story by J. K. Rowling and John Tiffany – PalaceElegy by Nick Payne – Donmar Warehouse
The Flick by Annie Baker – National Theatre Dorfman
One Night in Miami by Kemp Powers – Donmar Warehouse
|valign="top" |Groundhog Day – The Old VicDreamgirls – Savoy
The Girls – Phoenix
School of Rock – New London
|-
!width="50%" |Best Revival
!width="50%" |Best Musical Revival
|-
|valign="top" |Yerma – Young VicThe Glass Menagerie – Duke of York's
This House – Garrick
Travesties – Apollo
|valign="top" |Jesus Christ Superstar – Regent's Park Open AirFunny Girl – Savoy
Show Boat – New London
Sunset Boulevard – London Coliseum
|-
!width="50%" |Best New Comedy
!width="50%" |Best Entertainment and Family
|-
|valign="top" |Our Ladies of Perpetual Succour by Lee Hall – National Theatre DorfmanThe Comedy about a Bank Robbery by Henry Lewis, Jonathan Sayer and Henry Shields – Criterion
Nice Fish adapted by Mark Rylance, based on text by Louis Jenkins – Harold Pinter
The Truth by Florian Zeller, translated by Christopher Hampton – Wyndham's
|valign="top" |The Red Shoes – Sadler's WellsCinderella – London Palladium
David Baddiel – My Family: Not the Sitcom – Vaudeville
Peter Pan – National Theatre Olivier
|-
!width="50%" |Best Actor
!width="50%" |Best Actress
|-
|valign="top" |Jamie Parker as Harry Potter in Harry Potter and the Cursed Child – PalaceEd Harris as Dodge in Buried Child – Trafalgar Studios 1
Tom Hollander as Henry Carr in Travesties – Apollo
Ian McKellen as Spooner in No Man's Land – Wyndham's
|valign="top" |Billie Piper as Yerma in Yerma – Young Vic
Glenda Jackson as Lear in King Lear – The Old Vic
Cherry Jones as Amanda Wingfield in The Glass Menagerie – Duke of York's
Ruth Wilson as Hedda Gabler Tesman in Hedda Gabler – National Theatre Lyttelton
|-
!width="50%" |Best Actor in a Musical
!width="50%" |Best Actress in a Musical
|-
|valign="top" |
Andy Karl as Phil Connors in Groundhog Day – The Old Vic
David Fynn as Dewey Finn in School of Rock – New London
Tyrone Huntley as Judas Iscariot in Jesus Christ Superstar – Regent's Park Open Air
Charlie Stemp as Arthur Kipps in Half a Sixpence – Noël Coward
|valign="top" |
Amber Riley as Effie White in Dreamgirls – Savoy
Glenn Close as Norma Desmond in Sunset Boulevard – London Coliseum
Debbie Chazen, Sophie-Louise Dann, Michele Dotrice, Claire Machin, Claire Moore and Joanna Riding as Ruth, Celia, Jessie, Cora, Chris and Annie in The Girls – Phoenix
Sheridan Smith as Fanny Brice in Funny Girl – Savoy
|-
!width="50%" |Best Actor in a Supporting Role
!width="50%" |Best Actress in a Supporting Role
|-
|valign="top" |
Anthony Boyle as Scorpius Malfoy in Harry Potter and the Cursed Child – Palace
Freddie Fox as Tristan Tzara in Travesties – Apollo
Brian J Smith as Jim O'Connor in The Glass Menagerie – Duke of York's
Rafe Spall as Judge Brack in Hedda Gabler – National Theatre Lyttelton
|valign="top" |
Noma Dumezweni as Hermione Granger in Harry Potter and the Cursed Child – Palace
Melissa Allan, Caroline Deyga, Kirsty Findlay, Karen Fishwick, Kirsty MacLaren, Frances Mayli McCann, Joanne McGuinness and Dawn Sievewright as Orla, Chell, Understudy Chell/Fionnula/Kay, Kay, Manda, Kylah, Understudy Kylah/Manda/Orla and Fionnula in Our Ladies of Perpetual Succour – National Theatre Dorfman 
Clare Foster as Cecily Carruthers in Travesties – Apollo
Kate O'Flynn as Laura Wingfield in The Glass Menagerie – Duke of York's
|-
!width="50%" |Best Actor in a Supporting Role in a Musical
!width="50%" |Best Actress in a Supporting Role in a Musical
|-
|valign="top" |
Adam J. Bernard as James "Thunder" Early in Dreamgirls – Savoy
Ian Bartholomew as Chitterlow in Half a Sixpence – Noël Coward  
Ben Hunter as Danny in The Girls – Phoenix 
Andrew Langtree as Ned Ryerson in Groundhog Day – The Old Vic
|valign="top" |
Rebecca Trehearn as Julie LaVerne in Show Boat – New London
Haydn Gwynne as Celia Peachum in The Threepenny Opera – National Theatre Olivier
Victoria Hamilton-Barritt as The Narrator in Murder Ballad – Arts
Emma Williams as Helen Walsingham in Half a Sixpence – Noël Coward
|-
!width="50%" |Best Director
!width="50%" |Best Theatre Choreographer
|-
|valign="top" |
John Tiffany for Harry Potter and the Cursed Child – Palace
Simon Stone for Yerma – Young Vic
John Tiffany for The Glass Menagerie – Duke of York's
Matthew Warchus for Groundhog Day – The Old Vic
|valign="top" |
Matthew Bourne for The Red Shoes – Sadler's Wells
Peter Darling and Ellen Kane for Groundhog Day – The Old Vic
Steven Hoggett for Harry Potter and the Cursed Child – Palace
Drew McOnie for Jesus Christ Superstar – Regent's Park Open Air
|-
!width="50%" |Best Set Design
!width="50%" |Best Costume Design
|-
|valign="top" |
Christine Jones for Harry Potter and the Cursed Child – Palace
Bob Crowley for Aladdin – Prince Edward
Bob Crowley for The Glass Menagerie – Duke of York's
Rob Howell for Groundhog Day – The Old Vic 
|valign="top" |
Katrina Lindsay for Harry Potter and the Cursed Child – Palace
Gregg Barnes for Dreamgirls – Savoy
Hugh Durrant for Cinderella – London Palladium
Rob Howell for Groundhog Day – The Old Vic
|-
!width="50%" |Best Lighting Design
!width="50%" |Best Sound Design
|-
|valign="top" |
Neil Austin for Harry Potter and the Cursed Child – Palace
Lee Curran for Jesus Christ Superstar – Regent's Park Open Air
Natasha Katz for The Glass Menagerie – Duke of York's 
Hugh Vanstone for Groundhog Day – The Old Vic
|valign="top" |
Gareth Fry for Harry Potter and the Cursed Child – Palace
Paul Arditti for Amadeus – National Theatre Olivier
Adam Cork for Travesties – Apollo 
Nick Lidster for Autograph for Jesus Christ Superstar – Regent's Park Open Air
|-
!colspan=2 |Outstanding Achievement in Music
|-
|colspan=2 valign="top" |
The three children's bands for playing instruments live every night in School of Rock – New London
Henry Krieger for composing Dreamgirls – Savoy
Imogen Heap for composing and arranging Harry Potter and the Cursed Child – Palace
The band and company for creating the gig-like rock vibe of the original concept album of Jesus Christ Superstar – Regent's Park Open Air
|-
!width="50%" |Outstanding Achievement in Dance
!width="50%" |Best New Dance Production
|-
|valign="top" |
English National Ballet for expanding the variety of their repertoire with Akram Khan's Giselle and She Said – Sadler's Wells
Alvin Ailey American Dance Theater for their Dance Consortium-presented London season – Sadler's Wells
Luke Ahmet in The Creation by Rambert – Sadler's Wells
|valign="top" |'Betroffenheit by Crystal Pite and Jonathon Young – Sadler's WellsBlak Whyte Gray by Boy Blue Entertainment – Barbican
Giselle by Akram Khan and the English National Ballet – Sadler's Wells
My Mother, My Dog and CLOWNS! by Michael Clark – Barbican
|-
!width="50%" |Outstanding Achievement in Opera
!width="50%" |Best New Opera Production
|-
|valign="top" |Mark Wigglesworth for conducting Don Giovanni and Lulu – London ColiseumRenée Fleming in Der Rosenkavalier – Royal Opera House
Stuart Skelton in Tristan and Isolde – London Coliseum
|valign="top" |Akhnaten – London Coliseum4.48 Psychosis – Lyric Hammersmith
Così fan tutte – Royal Opera House
Lulu – London Coliseum
|-
!colspan=2|Outstanding Achievement in Affiliate Theatre
|-
|colspan=2 valign="top" |Rotterdam – Trafalgar Studios 2Cuttin' It, Young Vic / Royal Court – Young Vic, Maria
The Government Inspector – Theatre Royal Stratford East
The Invisible Hand – Tricycle
It Is Easy to Be Dead – Trafalgar Studios 2
|-
!colspan=2 |Society Special Award
|-
|colspan=2 valign="top" |Kenneth Branagh'|}

Productions with multiple wins and nominations
Multiple wins
The following productions received multiple awards:

9: Harry Potter and the Cursed Child2: Dreamgirls, Groundhog Day, The Red Shoes, YermaHarry Potter and the Cursed Child broke the record for winning the most awards by a single production, overtaking Matilda (2012) and The Curious Incident of the Dog in the Night-Time (2013) both winning seven.

Multiple nominations
The following 18 productions, including one opera and two dances, received multiple nominations:

11: Harry Potter and the Cursed Child8: Groundhog Day7: The Glass Menagerie6: Jesus Christ Superstar5: Dreamgirls, Travesties3: The Girls, Half a Sixpence, School of Rock, Yerma2: Cinderella, Funny Girl, Giselle, Hedda Gabler, Lulu, Our Ladies of Perpetual Succour, The Red Shoes, Show Boat, Sunset BoulevardHarry Potter and the Cursed Child tied for most nominations by a single production with Hairspray at the 2008 ceremony.

 Guest performers 
 Gary Barlow, Tim Firth and the cast of The Girls performing 'Yorkshire' (featuring an appearance from the original Calendar Girls)
 Amber Riley from Dreamgirls performing 'And I Am Telling You I'm Not Going'
 Tim Minchin and the cast of Groundhog Day performing 'Hope'
 Tyrone Huntley and the cast of Jesus Christ Superstar performing 'Heaven On Their Minds'
 David Fynn and the child cast of School of Rock performing 'Stick It To The Man'
 Sam Archer and Ashley Shaw performing a dance section from The Red Shoes Audra McDonald and choir of the Arts Education School performing 'Somewhere Over The Rainbow' during the In Memoriam'' section

See also 
 71st Tony Awards

References

External links
 Olivier Awards official website

Laurence Olivier Awards ceremonies
Laurence Olivier Awards
Laurence Olivier Awards
2017 theatre awards
April 2017 events in the United Kingdom
Events at the Royal Albert Hall